Order of Freedom may refer to:
Order of Freedom (Bosnia and Herzegovina)
Order of Freedom (Iran)
Order of Freedom (Yugoslavia)
Order of Freedom (Kosovo)